Emmanuel Ihuoma Okah, commonly known as Emma Okah, is a lawyer and politician in Rivers State. A member of the People's Democratic Party, he served as Chief Press Secretary under Governor Odili, and was also Commissioner of Information under Omehia's government. He has chaired the Media and Publicity Committee of the Rivers State People's Democratic Party Campaign Organisation. After the PDP took over, Governor Ezenwo Wike appointed him to his cabinet. He was confirmed by the House on 5 June 2015 was sworn-in as Housing Commissioner on 12 June 2015.

See also
List of people from Rivers State
Rivers State Housing and Property Development Authority

References

Living people
Commissioners of ministries of Rivers State
Rivers State Peoples Democratic Party politicians
Rivers State lawyers
First Wike Executive Council
People associated with the 2015 Rivers State gubernatorial election
Board members of the Greater Port Harcourt City Development Authority
Office of the Governor of Rivers State
Press secretaries
Year of birth missing (living people)